Pine Hall, also known as the Jeremiah Dunn House and Julian Gregory House, is a historic home located at Raleigh, Wake County, North Carolina.  It was built about 1841, and enlarged and remodeled in 1940–1941 in the Colonial Revival style.  The original core is a two-story, frame I-house with a hipped roof over a raised basement.  It features a two-story pedimented portico with massive Doric order columns.  Identical side-gable, single-pile, one-story wings were added with the 1940-1941 renovation.  Also on the property is a contributing garage (c. 1940–1941).

It was listed on the National Register of Historic Places in 2006.

References

Houses on the National Register of Historic Places in North Carolina
Colonial Revival architecture in North Carolina
Houses completed in 1941
Houses in Raleigh, North Carolina
National Register of Historic Places in Raleigh, North Carolina